The Emmy is an award that recognizes excellence in television.

Emmy or Emmie may also refer to:
Emmy (given name) or Emmie, a given name and list of people with the name
Emmie (singer) or Emma Sarah Morton-Smith (born 1977), English singer-songwriter
Emmy (Albanian singer) (1989–2011)
Emmy (Armenian singer) (born 1984)
Emmy (film), a 1934 Hungarian comedy
emmy (magazine), a television industry journal published by the Academy of Television Arts & Sciences
Hurricane Emmy, a tropical storm in the 1976 Atlantic hurricane season

See also
Emmy the Great or Emma-Lee Moss (born c. 1984), English singer-songwriter
Emy (disambiguation)